Detroit Assembly (also known as Detroit Cadillac, Cadillac Assembly or Clark Street Assembly) was a General Motors automobile factory in Detroit, Michigan on Clark Street, south of Michigan Avenue (U.S. Route 12). It began operations in 1921 and Cadillac bodies were supplied by Fleetwood Metal Body in 1921 after Fisher Body assumed operations. It was the second location that built Cadillacs, when Cadillac originally started out as the Henry Ford Company which was located at the intersection of Cass Avenue and Amsterdam Street. Engine block and cylinder heads were cast at Saginaw Metal Casting Operations then assembled at Tonawanda Engine before delivery to Detroit Assembly for installation.

In 1902, the Cadillac Motor Company began operations, and began building cars at the all new Clark Street facility in 1921, where the factory manufactured Cadillac models until December 23, 1987, when production of Cadillac's full-size D-bodies moved to Arlington Assembly in Arlington, Texas, while production of downsized FWD DeVille/Fleetwood/Seville models were relocated to Detroit/Hamtramck Assembly and Orion Assembly by 1985. It is  approximately 2 miles southeast of the original Lincoln factory located at 6200 West Warren Avenue.

All Cadillac vehicles were built only at this home factory, with production of popular selling models later added to Linden, New Jersey, South Gate, California or Arlington, Texas in "knock down kits" starting in the 1930s to meet demand. The bodies were built by Fisher at Fleetwood Plant #18 at 261 W End St, and transferred by rail to Clark Street for final assembly.

From 1984 to 1987, the plant also built the Oldsmobile 88 and Custom Cruiser and the Chevrolet Caprice.

Detroit Assembly used the VIN codes "Q" and "9."

The site of the plant was redeveloped into the 88-acre Clark Street Technology Park in 1997 by General Motors and three other partners. It is now the location for Inland Waters Pollution Control.

LaSalle Factory/DeSoto Factory
For a brief time Cadillac's LaSalle was built at a separate factory in Detroit called Wyoming Assembly at 6000 Wyoming Avenue just north of Ford Road west of the Ford Drive-In Theatre. It was built in 1917 to manufacture Liberty Engines for airplanes used during WW I, then the factory was used by Chalmers Automobile to build the Saxon automobile until 1922. General Motors bought the Chalmers Plant in 1926 and 1927 built LaSalle cars there. The factory is adjacent to the Dearborn neighborhood and is 2.75 miles west of the Clark Street Factory location. After LaSalle was no longer manufactured, it was purchased by Chrysler in 1934 and became a DeSoto factory until that brand was cancelled in the early 1960s. The factory is nearby railroad tracks which were very busy supplying coachwork from the Fleetwood Factory or other Fisher factories within Detroit and shipping finished product to cities across the United States.

Vehicles Manufactured

Historical and classic, 1902-1949

Early Antique
1902-1903 Cadillac Runabout and Tonneau — 72 in wheelbase single-cylinder engine
1903-1904 Cadillac Model A — 72 in wheelbase single-cylinder engine
1904 Cadillac Models A and B
Model A — 72 in wheelbase single-cylinder engine
Model B — 76 in wheelbase single-cylinder engine
1905 Cadillac Models B, C, D, E and F
Model B — 76 in wheelbase single-cylinder engine
Model C — 72 in wheelbase single-cylinder engine
Model D — 100 in wheelbase four-cylinder engine
Model E — 74 in wheelbase single-cylinder engine
Model F — 76 in wheelbase single-cylinder engine
1906 Cadillac Models H, K, L, and M
Model H — 102 in wheelbase four-cylinder engine
Model K — 74 in wheelbase single-cylinder engine
Model L — 110 in wheelbase four-cylinder engine
Model M — 76 in wheelbase single-cylinder engine
1907 Cadillac Models G, H, K, and M
Model G — 100 in wheelbase four-cylinder engine
Model H — 102 in wheelbase four-cylinder engine
Model K — 74 in wheelbase single-cylinder engine
Model M — 76 in wheelbase single-cylinder engine
1908 Cadillac Models G, H, M, S and T
Model G — 100 in wheelbase four-cylinder engine
Model H — 102 in wheelbase four-cylinder engine
Model M — 76 in wheelbase single-cylinder engine
Model S — 82 in wheelbase single-cylinder engine
Model T — 82 in wheelbase single-cylinder engine
1909-1911 Cadillac Model Thirty
1909 — 106 in wheelbase four-cylinder engine
1910 — 110 in wheelbase; 120 in wheelbase (limousine) four-cylinder engine Fisher
1911 — 116 in wheelbase four-cylinder engine Fisher
1912 — Cadillac Model 1912; 116 in wheelbase four-cylinder engine Fisher
1913 — Cadillac Model 1913; 120 in wheelbase four-cylinder engine Fisher
1914 — Cadillac Model 1914; 120 and 134 in wheelbase four-cylinder engine Fisher
1915 — Cadillac Type 51; 122  and 145 in wheelbase V8 Fisher
1916 — Cadillac Type 53; 122  132  and 145 in wheelbase V8 Fisher
1917 — Cadillac Type 55; 125  and 145 in wheelbase V8 Fisher
1918-1919 Cadillac Type 57; 125  132  and 145 in wheelbase V8 Fisher

1920s
1920-1921 Cadillac Type 59; 122  and 132 in wheelbase V8 Fisher
1922-1923 Cadillac Type 61; 132 in wheelbase V8 Fisher

All vehicles listed below were manufactured at Clark Street Assembly
1924 — Cadillac Type V-63; 132  and 145 in wheelbase V8 Fisher
1925 — Cadillac Type V-63; 132  138  and 145 in wheelbase V8 Fisher Fleetwood
1926-1927 Cadillac Series 314; 132  138  and 150 in wheelbase V8 Fisher Fleetwood
1928 — Cadillac Series 341-A; 140  and 152 in wheelbase V8 Fisher Fleetwood
1929 — Cadillac Series 341-B; 140  and 152 in wheelbase V8 Fisher Fleetwood

1930s
1930 Cadillac Series 353, 370 and 452 Fisher Fleetwood
Series 353 — 140  and 152 in wheelbase V8 Fisher Fleetwood
Series 370 — 140  143  and 152 in wheelbase V12 Fisher Fleetwood
Series 452 — 148 in wheelbase V16 Fisher Fleetwood
1931 Cadillac Series 355, 370-A and 452-A Fisher Fleetwood 
Series 355 — 134  and 152 in wheelbase V8 Fleetwood
Series 370-A — 140  143  and 152 in wheelbase V12 Fleetwood
Series 452-A — 148 in wheelbase V16 Fisher Fleetwood
1932 Cadillac Series 355-B, 370-B and 452-B Fisher Fleetwood
Series 355-B — 134  and 156 in wheelbase V8 Fisher Fleetwood
Series 370-B — 140  and 156 in wheelbase V12 Fisher Fleetwood
Series 452-B — 143 and 149 in wheelbase V16 Fisher Fleetwood
1933 Cadillac Series 355-C, 370-C and 452-C Fisher Fleetwood 
Series 355-C — 140  and 156 in wheelbase V8
Series 370-C — 134  140  and 156 in wheelbase V12
Series 452-C — 143  and 149 in wheelbase V16
1934 Cadillac Series 10, 20, 30 and 452-D Fisher Fleetwood 
Series 10 — 128 in wheelbase V8
Series 20 — 136 in wheelbase V8
Series 30 — 146 in wheelbase V8
Series 355-D
Series 370-D — 146 in wheelbase V12
Series 452-D — 154 in wheelbase V16
1935 Cadillac Series 10, 20, 30 and 452-D Fisher Fleetwood 
Series 10 — 128 in wheelbase V8
Series 20 — 136 in wheelbase V8
Series 30 — 146 in wheelbase V8
Series 370-D — 146 and 160 in wheelbase V12
Series 452-D or 60 — 154 in wheelbase V16
1936 Cadillac Series 36–60, 36–70, 36–75, 36–80, 36–85, 36-90 Fisher Fleetwood 
Series 36-60 — 121 in wheelbase V8
Series 36-70 — 131 in wheelbase V8
Series 36-75 — 138 in wheelbase V8
Series 36-80 — 131 and 160 in wheelbase V12
Series 36-85 — 138 in wheelbase V12
Series 36-90 — 154 in wheelbase V16
1937 Cadillac Series 36–60, 37–65, 37–70, 37–75, 37–85, 37-90 Fisher Fleetwood 
Series 37-60 — 124  and 160.75 in wheelbase V8
Series 37-65 — 131 in wheelbase V8
Series 37-70 — 131 in wheelbase V8
Series 37-75 — 138  and 156 in wheelbase V8
Series 37-85 — 138 in wheelbase V12
Series 37-90 — 154 in wheelbase V16
1938 Cadillac Series 38–60, 38-60S, 38–65, 38–75, 38-90 Fisher Fleetwood 
Series 38-60 — 124  and 160 in wheelbase V8
Series 38-60S — 127 in wheelbase V8
Series 38-65 — 132  in wheelbase V8
Series 38-75 — 141  and 160 in wheelbase V8
Series 38-90 — 141 in wheelbase V16
1939 Cadillac Series 39-60S, 39–65, 39–75, 39-90 Fisher Fleetwood 
Series 39-60S — 127 in wheelbase V8
Series 39-61 — 126  and 162_ in wheelbase V8
Series 39-75 — 141  and 161_ in wheelbase V8
Series 39-90 — 141 in wheelbase V16

1940s
1940 Cadillac Series 40-60S, 40–62, 40–72, 40–75, 40-90 Fisher Fleetwood 
Series 40-60S — 127 in wheelbase V8
Series 40-62 — 129 in wheelbase V8
Series 40-72 — 138  and 165_ in wheelbase V8
Series 40-75 — 141  and 161_ in wheelbase V8
Series 40-90 — 141 in wheelbase V16
1941 Cadillac Series 41-60S, 41–61, 41–62, 41–63, 41–67, 41-75 Fisher Fleetwood 
Series 41-60S — 126 in wheelbase V8
Series 41-61 — 126 in wheelbase V8
Series 41-62 — 126  and 163 in wheelbase V8
Series 41-63 — 126 in wheelbase V8
Series 41-67 — 139 in wheelbase V8
Series 41-75 — 136  and 163 in wheelbase V8
1942 Cadillac Series 42-60S, 42–61, 42–62, 42–63, 42–67, 42-75 Fisher Fleetwood 
Series 42-60S Fleetwood — 133 in wheelbase V8
Series 42-61 — 126 in wheelbase V8
Series 42-62 — 129 in wheelbase V8
Series 42-63 — 126 in wheelbase V8
Series 42-67 — 139 in wheelbase V8
Series 42-75 — 136  and 163 in wheelbase V8
1946 Cadillac Series 60S, 61, 62, 75 Fisher Fleetwood 
Series 60S Fleetwood — 133 in wheelbase V8
Series 61 — 126 in wheelbase V8
Series 62 — 129 in wheelbase V8
Series 75 — 136 in wheelbase V8
1947 Cadillac Series 60S, 61, 62, 75 Fisher Fleetwood 
Series 60S Fleetwood — 133 in wheelbase V8
Series 61 — 126 in wheelbase V8
Series 62 — 129 in wheelbase V8
Series 75 — 138 in wheelbase V8
1948-1949 Cadillac Series 60S, 61, 62, 75 Fisher Fleetwood 
Series 60S Fleetwood — 133 in wheelbase V8
Series 61 — 126 in wheelbase V8
Series 62 — 126 in wheelbase V8
Series 75 — 136 in wheelbase V8

Modern Era
Cadillac Seville
Cadillac Calais
Cadillac DeVille
Cadillac Eldorado
Cadillac Fleetwood
Cadillac Fleetwood Brougham

See also
List of GM factories
List of Chrysler factories
List of former automotive manufacturing plants

References

General Motors factories
Chrysler factories
Industrial buildings and structures in Detroit
Former motor vehicle assembly plants
Motor vehicle assembly plants in Michigan
1921 establishments in Michigan
1987 disestablishments in Michigan
Mill architecture